The human gene ARMC6 encodes a protein called Armadillo repeat-containing protein 6.

The function of this gene's protein product has not been determined. A related protein in mouse suggests that this protein has a conserved function.

The protein is characterized by the presence of armadillo repeats in its amino acid sequence. Diseases associated with ARMC6 include pancreatic cancer, and pancreatitis.

References

External links

Further reading

Armadillo-repeat-containing proteins